Buekenhout may refer to:

 Francis Buekenhout, a Belgian mathematician;
 Buekenhout geometry, or Buekenhout–Tits geometry, a generalization of projective spaces, Tits buildings, and several other geometric structures, introduced in 1979 by Francis Buekenhout.